The nipperkin is a unit of measurement of volume, equal to one-half of a quarter-gill, one-eighth of a gill, or one thirty-second of an English pint. In other estimations, one nip (an abbreviation that originated in 1796) is either one-third of a pint, or any amount less than or equal to half a pint.  A nipperkin is also one-eighth of a pint of beer or any other liquor.

See also
 "The Barley Mow"

References

Units of volume